Dragan Smiljanić  (born March 3, 1970) is a former Serbian professional basketball player who last played for 08 Stockholm Human Rights.

References

External links
 

1970 births
Living people
Basketball League of Serbia players
Serbian expatriate basketball people in Cyprus
Serbian expatriate basketball people in Israel
Serbian expatriate basketball people in Hungary
Serbian expatriate basketball people in Sweden
Serbian expatriate basketball people in Switzerland
Serbian expatriate basketball people in Poland
Serbian expatriate basketball people in Portugal
Serbian expatriate basketball people in Russia
Serbian expatriate basketball people in North Macedonia
Serbian men's basketball players
Sportspeople from Užice
Centers (basketball)